Torje is both a given name and a surname. Notable people with the name include:

Gabriel Torje (born 1989), Romanian footballer
Torje Olsen Solberg (1856–1947), Norwegian politician

Romanian-language surnames
Norwegian masculine given names